Adrian Sikora (born 19 March 1980 in Ustroń) is a Polish footballer who currently plays as a striker.

Career

Dyskobolia
He had played for Dyskobolia Grodzisk Wielkopolski, with which he won the Polish Cup twice in 2005 and 2007.

Real Murcia
Sikora played for Murcia on season 2008–09.

APOEL
He signed a two years contract with Cypriot Champions APOEL in July 2009. He scored his first two goals with APOEL on 26 September in a league game with Doxa Katokopia but was injured and missed the rest of the season. Although fans were hopeful in seeing the Polish striker in action in the next season, new injuries meant he would miss the next half of the season. He didn't have a chance to play in APOEL, and so he moved to the reserves team of APOEL for all the second half of 2010-11 season, until his contract ended.

Piast Gliwice
On August 1, 2012, he joined Piast Gliwice on a one-year contract.

International
Sikora has also played two times for the Poland national football team, scoring one goal in a friendly match against Malta on 11 December 2003.

References

External links
 
 

1980 births
Living people
People from Ustroń
Polish footballers
Poland international footballers
Polish expatriate footballers
Association football forwards
Górnik Zabrze players
Dyskobolia Grodzisk Wielkopolski players
Real Murcia players
APOEL FC players
Podbeskidzie Bielsko-Biała players
Piast Gliwice players
Expatriate footballers in Spain
Expatriate footballers in Cyprus
Ekstraklasa players
Segunda División players
Cypriot First Division players
Sportspeople from Silesian Voivodeship